Catarina dos Santos (born 8 July 1994) is a German lawyer and politician of the Christian Democratic Union who has been serving as a member of the Bundestag since 2021.

Early life and career
Dos Santos was born in Lisbon in 1994 and grew up in Eschweiler. She worked as a lawyer at a law firm in Meerbusch.

Political career
Dos Santos joined the CDU in 2014.

Dos Santos became member of the Bundestag in the 2021 elections, representing the Aachen II district. In parliament, she has since been serving on the Committee on European Affairs and the Committee on Digital Affairs.

In addition to her committee assignments, Dos Santos is part of the German-Portuguese Parliamentary Friendship Group and the German delegation to the Franco-German Parliamentary Assembly. She has also been a member of the German delegation to the Parliamentary Assembly of the Council of Europe (PACE) since 2022. In the Assembly, she serves on the Committee on Migration, Refugees and Displaced Persons.

Other activities
 Aachener Straßenbahn und Energieversorgungs-AG (ASEAG), Member of the Advisory Board

References 

Living people
1994 births
Christian Democratic Union of Germany politicians
Members of the Bundestag 2021–2025
21st-century German politicians
21st-century German women politicians